Ziarat-e Hezart Abbas (also Romanized as Zīārat-e Hez̤art ʿAbbās) is a village in Esfandaqeh Rural District, in the Central District of Jiroft County, Kerman Province, Iran. At the 2006 census, its population was 37, in 9 families.

References 

Populated places in Jiroft County